Omorgus tytus is a beetle of the family Trogidae.

References 

tytus
Beetles described in 1941